Gantofta IF is a Swedish football club located in Gantofta.

Background
Gantofta Idrottsförening were formed in 1942 but there most successful period has been over the last decade when they progressed from Division 6 in 2000 to Division 2 in 2006 and then spent 2 further seasons in Division 3. Sadly three relegations over the last 4 seasons will see GIF back in Division 6 for the 2012 season.

In 2011 Gantofta IF has played in Division 5 Skåne Västra which is the seventh tier of Swedish football. They play their home matches at the Stendösvallen in Gantofta.

The club is affiliated to Skånes Fotbollförbund. Gantofta IF played in the 2006 Svenska Cupen winning 4–1 away to Oxie IF in the first round before losing 1–2 at home to Kristianstads FF in the second round. In the following year in the 2007 Svenska Cupen GIF won 4–1 away to Furulunds IK in the first round before losing 0–3 at home to Umeå FC in the second round in front of 200 spectators.

Season to season

Footnotes

External links
 Gantofta IF – Official website

Sport in Skåne County
Football clubs in Skåne County
1942 establishments in Sweden